Contact paper is an adhesive paper used as a covering or lining.

Description
Contact paper is an inexpensive material that has a decorative surface on one side and a highly adhesive material on the other side. The paper sticks to the desired surface with minimal effort. It is usually sold in roll form and the material is cut to size by the user. While its traditional use was as a shelf or drawer liner, or for covering cupboard doors, it can be used in many creative ways. Teachers often use it for creative projects at school. Other uses of contact paper include use as laptop skins and protective book covers.

Types
Contact paper is usually categorized by the kind of surface that it is supposed to stick to. Some of the types of contact paper include:

 Adhesive contact paper
 Shelf liner contact paper
 Stainless steel contact paper
 Glass contact paper
 Vinyl contact paper

Uses
 Commonly used to line or cover kitchen and bathroom cabinets and drawers, counter tops, bookshelves, closet shelving, and pantry areas
 Covering up or protecting areas which have become (or could become) stained or ruined because of a project. Examples include art projects, foods and liquids, destructive substances
 The clear variety can be used for laminating books, art projects, posters, pictures, or other objects
 As part of a collage

Application
Most contact paper products feature an easy-to-peel liner and an adhesive that allows for repositioning of the material during installation. The material can be cut to size with scissors for custom applications depending on the requirement.

See also 
 Self-adhesive plastic sheet

References

Paper